Leonidas P. “Lou” Raptakis (born November 18, 1959 in Cranston, Rhode Island) is an American politician and a Democratic member of the Rhode Island Senate representing District 33 since January 2013. Raptakis served non-consecutively from January 1997 until January 2011 in the District 20 and 33 seats, having served consecutively in the Rhode Island General Assembly from January 1993 until January 1997 in the Rhode Island House of Representatives District 31 seat. He was a candidate for Secretary of State of Rhode Island in 2010.

Education
Raptakis earned his associate degree from the Community College of Rhode Island and his BA from Rhode Island College.

Elections
2012 To challenge District 33 incumbent Republican Senator Glenford Shibley, Raptakis ran in the September 11, 2012 Democratic Primary, winning with 1,318 votes (61.1%), and won the November 6, 2012 General election with 7,761 votes (61.6%) against Senator Shibley.
1992 Raptakis won the House District 31 September 15, 1992 Democratic Primary and won the three-way November 3, 1992 General election with 2,943 votes (57.6%) against Republican nominee Alice Stratton and Independent candidate John Trafford.
1994 Raptakis was unopposed for both the September 13, 1994 Democratic Primary and the November 8, 1994 General election, winning with 3,024 votes.
1996 Raptakis challenged Senate District 20 incumbent Senator Jennie Day in the three-way September 10, 1996 Democratic Primary, winning with 940 votes (56.3%) and was unopposed for the November 5, 1996 General election, winning with 5,572 votes.
1998 Raptakis was challenged in the September 15, 1998 Democratic Primary, winning with 677 votes (%84.7), and was unopposed for the November 3, 1998 General election, winning with 4,813 votes.
2000 Raptakis was unopposed for both the September 12, 2000 Democratic Primary, winning with 886 votes, and the November 7, 2000 General election, winning with 5,838 votes.
2002 Redistricted to District 33, and with incumbent Senator Daniel Connors redistricted to District 19, Raptakis was challenged in the September 10, 2002 Democratic Primary, winning with 1,475 votes (73.6%), and won the November 5, 2002 General election with 5,639 votes (60.3%) against Republican nominee Jonathan Farnum.
2004 Raptakis was unopposed for both the September 14, 2004 Democratic Primary, winning with 673 votes, and the November 2, 2004 General election, winning with 8,876 votes.
2006 Raptakis was unopposed for both the September 12, 2006 Democratic Primary, winning with 1,170 votes, and the November 7, 2006 General election, winning with 9,432 votes.
2008 Raptakis was unopposed for both the September 9, 2008 Democratic Primary, winning with 692 votes, and the November 4, 2008 General election, winning with 9,736 votes.
2010 Raptakis challenged incumbent Rhode Island Secretary of State A. Ralph Mollis in the September 23, 2010 Democratic Primary, but lost to Mollis, who won re-election in the November 2, 2010 General election against Republican nominee Catherine Taylor.

References

External links
Official page at the Rhode Island General Assembly

Leonidas P. Raptakis at Ballotpedia
Leonidas Raptakis at the National Institute on Money in State Politics

1959 births
Living people
American people of Greek descent
Community College of Rhode Island alumni
Democratic Party members of the Rhode Island House of Representatives
People from Coventry, Rhode Island
Politicians from Cranston, Rhode Island
Rhode Island College alumni
Democratic Party Rhode Island state senators
21st-century American politicians